Thiolapillus is a genus of bacteria from the class Gammaproteobacteria with one known species (Thiolapillus brandeum).

References

Gammaproteobacteria
Bacteria genera
Monotypic bacteria genera